
Year 734 (DCCXXXIV) was a common year starting on Friday (link will display the full calendar) of the Julian calendar. The denomination 734 for this year has been used since the early medieval period, when the Anno Domini calendar era became the prevalent method in Europe for naming years.

Events 
 By place 
 Europe 
 Battle of the Boarn:  The Franks under Charles Martel, mayor of the palace of Neustria and Austrasia, defeat the Frisians near the mouth of the River Boarn (now the Dutch province of Friesland). During the battle, the Frisian army is beaten and King Poppo is killed. The Franks gain control of the Frisian lands west of the Lauwers (Netherlands), and begin plundering the pagan sanctuaries. The Frisians become Frankish vassals, apart from the tribes living in East Frisia in present day Germany. 
 Umayyad conquest of Gaul: Muslim forces under Abd al-Malik ibn Katan al-Fihri, governor (wali) of Al-Andalus (modern Spain), enter Provence and raid the Rhône Valley. The cities of Avignon, Arles, and probably Marseille are handed over by Count Maurontus, who is in rebellion against Charles Martel.
8 September:  Frithubeorht is consecrated Bishop of Hexham.

 Mesoamerica 
 Jasaw Chan K'awiil I, ruler (ajaw) of Tikal (Guatemala), dies after a 52-year reign. He is succeeded by his son Yik'in Chan K'awiil, who becomes one of Tikal's most successful and expansionary rulers during the Late Classic period.
 During the Third Tikal-Calakmul War, K’ak Tiliw Chan Yopaat gives himself the title k’uhul ajaw, thus declaring Quiriguá’s independence from Copán.

 Asia 
 On March 23, 734 AD, a large earthquake happened in Qinzhou of Tang Dynasty, now the vicinity of Tianshui City, causing serious seismic disasters as "the earth ruptured and closed again, nearly all the houses damaged, about 4000 people dead, hills changed into valleys, and towns covered by landslip, and so on".

Births 
 Fujiwara no Kurajimaro, Japanese politician (d. 775)
 Khurshid II, ruler (ispahbadh) of Tabaristan (d. 761)

Deaths 
 July 30 – Tatwine, Mercian archbishop of Canterbury (b. c.670?)
 Bilge Khagan, ruler (khagan) of the Second Turkic Khaganate (b. 683/4)
 Bilihildis, Frankish noblewoman and abbess
 Bubo, Duke of the Frisians
 Approximate date – Caintigern, Irish-born hermit
 Jasaw Chan K'awiil I, ruler (ajaw) of Tikal

References